Patsy Bradley is a Gaelic footballer who plays for the Robert Emmet's Slaughtneil club and the Derry county team. He has won a National League title with his county and the Derry Senior Football Championship with his club. For both club and county Bradley usually plays in midfield.

Playing career

Inter-county
Bradley was part of the Derry Minor side that won the 2002 Ulster Minor and All-Ireland Minor Championships. He was a member of the Derry Under 21 team that finished runners-up in the 2004 Ulster Under 21 Championship.

He was part of the Derry Senior panel that won the 2008 National League where Derry beat Kerry in the final.

Club
In 2004 Bradley was part of the first Slaughtneil side to win the Derry Senior Football Championship, defeating Bellaghy in the final. Slaughtneil reached the final again in 2008, but were beaten by Ballinderry Shamrocks.  In 2014 Bradley was part of the Slaughtneil side who won both the Derry Senior Football Championship and the Ulster Senior Club Football Championship. He helped Slaughtneil repeat this achievement again in 2016 in a tight contest against Kilcoo from Down.

Honours
Derry
National Football League (1): 2008
All-Ireland Minor Football Championship (1): 2002
Ulster Minor Football Championship (1): 2002

Slaughtneil
Ulster Senior Club Football Championship (2): 2014, 2016
Derry Senior Football Championship (3): 2004, 2014, 2016

References

External links
Player profiles on Derry GAA website

1984 births
Living people
Derry inter-county Gaelic footballers
Slaughtneil Gaelic footballers